Lunka is a village in Chernivtsi Raion, Chernivtsi Oblast, Ukraine. It belongs to Hertsa urban hromada, one of the hromadas of Ukraine.

Until 18 July 2020, Lunka belonged to Hertsa Raion. The raion was abolished in July 2020 as part of the administrative reform of Ukraine, which reduced the number of raions of Chernivtsi Oblast to three. The area of Hertsa Raion was merged into Chernivtsi Raion.

Lunca massacre

A massacre took place there on February 7, 1941, when hundreds of civilians (mostly ethnic Romanians) were killed during an attempt to cross the border from the Soviet Union to Romania.

References

Villages in Chernivtsi Raion